Oleksandr Heorgiyovych Pogoryelov (Aleksandr Georgiyevich Pogorelov; born 22 January 1952 in Valuyki; died 17 October 2007 in Odessa) was a Soviet and Ukrainian professional football player and coach.

Honours
 Soviet Top League champion: 1983.

External links
 Career summary by KLISF

References

1952 births
People from Valuyki, Belgorod Oblast
2007 deaths
Soviet footballers
Soviet football managers
Russian footballers
Ukrainian footballers
Ukrainian football managers
Soviet Top League players
FC Chornomorets Odesa players
PFC CSKA Moscow players
FC Dnipro players
CSKA Pamir Dushanbe players
FC Elektrometalurh-NZF Nikopol players
FC Elektrometalurh Nikopol managers
Association football forwards
Sportspeople from Belgorod Oblast